Moppi may refer to:

 a Microsoft Office Professional Plus installer for the Command-line interface
 Moppi Productions, a Finnish-based Demogroup
 a character from the German children's TV series Sandmännchen